Dave Hitchcock is an English former record producer working with Genesis, Caravan, Camel, Curved Air and Renaissance.

Biography
David Hitchcock worked in A&R as a staff producer at Decca Records before becoming an independent record producer. He worked with Decca Records and Charisma Records and formed the company Gruggy Woof Productions.

Hitchcock later retrained as a chartered accountant with KPMG with the aim of becoming someone who could provide financial advice for musicians. He then joined Ernst & Young's Entertainment & Media Group. In 1992, he left to manage the business affairs of Monty Python before founding his own accountancy business, DBM Ltd, "For artists, producers, writers and other creatives - 85% of what we do is music-related."

Production credits 

Albums produced by Hitchcock include:

Albums with Camel
 Mirage (1974)
 Snow Goose (1975)
Albums with Caravan
 In the Land of Grey and Pink (1971)
 Waterloo Lily (1972)
 For Girls Who Grow Plump in the Night (1973)
 Caravan & the New Symphonia (1974)
 Live (1975)
 Cunning Stunts (1975)
 Blind Dog at St. Dunstans (1976)
 Where But for Caravan Would I? (2000)
 Live at the Fairfield Halls, 1974 (2002)
Albums with Curved Air
 Curved Air – Live (1975)
Albums with East of Eden
 Snafu (1970)
 East of Eden (1971)
Albums with Genesis
 Foxtrot (1972)
EP with Marillion
 Market Square Heroes (1982)
Albums with Mellow Candle
 Swaddling Songs (1971)
Albums with The Pink Fairies
 Kings of Oblivion (1973)
 Pink Fairies (1991)

References 

Living people
A&R people
English record producers
Grammy Award winners
Caravan (band) members
Year of birth missing (living people)